The Odin-class submarine (or "O class") was a class of nine submarines developed and built for the Royal Navy (RN) in the 1920s. The prototype, was followed by two boats originally ordered for the Royal Australian Navy, but transferred to the RN in 1931 because of the poor economic situation in Australia, and six modified boats ordered for the RN. Three modified boats were built for the Chilean Navy as the s in 1929.

Design
The class was built to replace the ageing L-class submarines which did not have adequate endurance for use in the Pacific Ocean. Armament consisted of eight  torpedo tubes (6 bow, 2 stern) and one  gun. The boats were of a saddle tank type with fuel carried in riveted external tanks. These external tanks proved vulnerable to leaking after depth charge damage, thus betraying the position of the submarine. These boats were the first British submarines fitted with Asdic and VLF radio which could be used at periscope depth.

Boats

References

External links

 RN Subs 1925 - 1946: Odin Class
 Battleships-cruisers.co.uk: Odin Class
 Uboat.net

 

 
Submarine classes